The golden-olive woodpecker (Colaptes rubiginosus) is a species of bird in subfamily Picinae of the woodpecker family Picidae. It is found from Mexico south and east through Panama, in every mainland South American country except Chile, Paraguay, and Uruguay, and in Trinidad and Tobago.

Taxonomy and systematics

The golden-olive woodpecker was originally described as the "brown woodpecker" (Picus rubiginosus). It was later placed in genus Piculus but since about 2007 has been moved into Colaptes by taxonomic systems.

The International Ornithological Committee (IOC) and BirdLife International's Handbook of the Birds of the World assign these 18 subspecies to the golden-olive woodpecker:

C. r. yucatanensis (Cabot, S., 1844)
C. r. alleni (Bangs, 1902)
C. r. buenavistae (Chapman, 1915)
C. r. meridensis (Ridgway, 1911)
C. r. rubiginosus (Swainson, 1820)
C. r. deltanus (Aveledo & Ginés, 1953)
C. r. paraquensis (Phelps, W.H. & Phelps, W.H. Jr., 1948)
C. r. guianae (Hellmayr, 1918)
C. r. viridissimus (Chapman, 1939)
C. r. nigriceps (Blake, 1941)
C. r. trinitatis (Ridgway, 1911)
C. r. tobagensis (Ridgway, 1911)
C. r. gularis (Hargitt, 1889)
C. r. rubripileus (Salvadori & Festa, 1900)
C. r. coloratus (Chapman, 1923)
C. r. chrysogaster (Berlepsch & Stolzmann, 1902) (At one time treated as a separate species) 
C. r. canipileus (d'Orbigny, 1840)
C. r. tucumanus (Cabanis, 1883)

The American Ornithological Society and the Clements taxonomy add C. r. aeruginosus which IOC and HBW treat as a separate species, the bronze-winged woodpecker.

Further splittings of these subspecies have been proposed at various times but each is currently (2023) considered synonymous with a member of this list.

According to some authors, the golden-olive woodpecker sensu lato and the grey-crowned woodpecker (C. auricularis) form a superspecies. However, research since 2010 has found that the golden-olive C. rubiginosus is not monophyletic, with some subspecies being more closely related to the grey-crowned woodpecker and others more closely related to the black-necked woodpecker (C. atricollis) than they are to other golden-olive subspecies.

The specific epithet rubiginosus means "full of rust", describing the color of the bird's wings and back.

This article follows the 18-subspecies IOC/HBW model.

Description

Males and females have the same plumage except on their heads. Adult males of the nominate subspecies C. r. rubiginosus have a slate gray forehead and crown with a red border and nape. They are pale buff to whitish from their lores around the eye to the red of the nape. They have a wide red malar stripe and a pale buffy white chin and upper throat; the last has heavy blackish streaks. Adult females have red only on their nape, and their malar area has streaks like the throat. Both sexes have mostly green upperparts with a bronze tinge; their rump and uppertail coverts are paler and barred with dark olive. Their flight feathers are dark brownish olive with greenish edges and some yellowish on the shafts. Their tail is brown. Their underparts are pale buffy yellow with blackish olive bars; the bars are closest together on the chest. Their medium-length bill is slaty gray to black, their iris deep dull red, and the legs gray to olive-gray. Juveniles are generally duller than adults and have less well defined barring on their underparts.

The other subspecies of golden-olive woodpecker differ from the nominate in size, the color of their backs, and the base color and barring of their underparts. The differences are summarized in comparison to the nominate:

C. r. yucatanensis, larger but variable, lighter barring on breast
C. r. alleni, large, bronze-gold with red tinges above, black throat with white spots, narrow bars on breast, red on male's crown
C. r. buenavistae, very large, bronzy back with reddish tinge, darkly barred rump, olive green bars on underparts
C. r. meridensis, like buenavistae but somewhat smaller with a less bronzy back
C. r. deltanus, small, greener back and larger white spots on throat
C. r. paraquensis, large, strong bronze tinge on back, dark dark gray crown with little red
C. r. guianae, large, bronzy yellow-green back, very small pale throat spots, moderate amount of red on crown
C. r. viridissimus, very large, bright yellow-green back, whitish base color and wide black barring on breast, male has less red on head
C. r. nigriceps, like guianae but with little or no bronze
C. r. trinitatis, like tobagensis but much smaller with a less heavy bill
C. r. tobagensis, large, bronze-gold with red tinges above, black throat with white spots, medium-width greenish bars on breast
C. r. gularis large, fine white throat spots, pale underparts, male has entirely red crown and female slightly less
C. r. rubripileus, like gularis but smaller with blacker breast barring
C. r. coloratus, slightly bronzy upperparts, bright yellow mostly unbarred belly, barred flanks
C. r. chrysogaster, very bronzy back with red tinge, unbarred yellow belly, male has much red on crown
C. r. canipileus, very bronzy back with red tinge, lightly barred yellow belly, male has much red on crown
C. r. tucumanus, large, dull green and less bronzy back, whiter underparts with blackish barring

Distribution and habitat

The subspecies of the golden-olive woodpecker are found thus:

C. r. yucatanensis, from Oaxaca and Veracruz in Mexico through Belize, Guatemala, Honduras, El Salvador, Nicaragua, and Costa Rica into western Panama
C. r. alleni, Colombia's Sierra Nevada de Santa Marta and nearby
C. r. buenavistae, the eastern Andes of Colombia and Ecuador
C. r. meridensis, Venezuela's Serranía del Perijá, western Coastal Range, and Andes
C. r. rubiginosus, north-central and northeastern Venezuelan mountains
C. r. deltanus, northeastern Venezuela's Delta Amacuro state
C. r. paraquensis, the tepuis of south-central Venezuela
C. r. guianae, the tepuis of eastern Venezuela and western Guyana
C. r. viridissimus, Auyán-tepui in southeastern Venezuela
C. r. nigriceps, the Acarai Mountains of southern Guyana and southern Suriname
C. r. trinitatis, Trinidad
C. r. tobagensis, Tobago
C. r. gularis, Colombia's Cordillera Occidental and Cordillera Central
C. r. rubripileus, from southwestern Colombia through western Ecuador to Peru's Department of Lambayeque
C. r. coloratus, from the Cordillera del Cóndor in extreme southeastern Ecuador into north-central Peru to Department of San Martín
C. r. chrysogaster, between the departments of Huánuco and Cuzco in central Peru
C. r. canipileus, from southern Peru into central and southeastern Bolivia
C. r. tucumanus, from southern Bolivia south to Tucumán Province in Argentina

The golden-olive woodpecker inhabits a very wide variety of landscapes, mostly semi-open to dense. They range from dry tropical thornscrub to humid rainforest. Between those extremes are cloudforest, oak-pine woodland, dry deciduous forest, riparian thickets, and mangroves. They are often also found along the edges of forest, in scattered trees within clearings, and in shade-grown coffee plantations.

Behavior

Movement

As far as is known, the golden-olive woodpecker is a year-round resident throughout its range.

Feeding

The golden-olive woodpecker forages from the forest's mid level to the canopy, exploring the trunk, limbs, branches, and vines of large trees. It hunts by itself, in loose pairs, and as part of mixed species feeding flocks. It pecks, hammers, probes, prys, and sometimes gleans to capture its prey. Its primary diet is ants, termites, and wood-boring beetles and their larvae; it adds fruits and berries but rarely.

Breeding

The golden-olive woodpecker's breeding season has not been determined for its whole range, but it appears to vary geographically. It breeds between January and May from Mexico to Colombia, from December or January to June or July in Ecuador and Peru, and the season perhaps includes October in Guyana. Both sexes incubate the clutch of two to four eggs but the incubation period is not known. Both parents provision nestlings by regurgitation for the approximately 24 days between hatch and fledging.

Vocal and non-vocal sounds

The golden-olive woodpecker's song is "a protracted rising rattling trill." Its other vocalizations include a repeated "loud, clear dree", a "single sharp deeeeh", a "sharp kyown", a "churr, choo-úr", a "liquid woick-woick-woick", and a "utzia-deek". It occasionally drums in "rolls very short, sometimes repeated at short intervals; sometimes as clearly separated strikes."

Status

The IUCN has assessed the golden-olive woodpecker as being of Least Concern. It has an extremely large range but its population size is not known and is believed to be decreasing. No immediate threats have been identified. It is considered fairly common to common in most of its range and occurs in many protected areas. "This widespread species’ ability to live in a wide variety of wooded habitats suggests that its future is secure."

References

Further reading

External links

 Golden-olive woodpecker stamps from El Salvador, Nicaragua and Trinidad and Tobago at bird-stamps.org
 
 

golden-olive woodpecker
Birds of Central America
Birds of the Yucatán Peninsula
Birds of Mexico
Birds of El Salvador
Birds of Nicaragua
Birds of Belize
Birds of Guatemala
Birds of Honduras
Birds of Costa Rica
Birds of Panama
Birds of the Northern Andes
Birds of the Guianas
Birds of Trinidad and Tobago
golden-olive woodpecker